The University of Canterbury Drama Society Inc (DramaSoc) is a student performing-arts club at the University of Canterbury, Christchurch, New Zealand. It began in 1921, and enjoyed a reputation as one of New Zealand's leading theatre groups from the 1920s to the 1960s, with notable alumni including Dame Ngaio Marsh and Sam Neill. With the exception of some brief pauses, the club has continued to be the primary non-musical theatre society of the university, and remains active today, with a membership numbering from dozens to hundreds and typically staging at least two or three productions each year.

History
The Canterbury University College Drama Society began in  under the leadership of Professor Sir James Shelley. It enjoyed a reputation as one of New Zealand's leading theatre groups from the 1920s to the 1960s. The Society was most notably active in the 1942–1969 era under Dame Ngaio Marsh, with critically acclaimed productions (especially of Shakespeare plays) and a 1949 theatre tour of Australia.

The Society was wound up in the early 1990s due to financial difficulties but was resurrected by an ad hoc committee in October and November 1993, and restarted as a full student club in the beginning of 1994. In 2016 DramaSoc experienced a brief pause in events as club leadership faltered, before a new committee was formed at the 2016 AGM. The AGM was controversial, with the new committee consisting of 10 members, 7 of whom had never taken part in a DramaSoc event before that date. The AGM was attended by several prominent members of DramaSoc's sister club, the University Of Canterbury Musical Theatre Society (also known as MUSOC), and was subsequently described as MUSOC's 'hostile takeover' of DramaSoc by several DramaSoc members. Despite that incident, since then the club has experienced much growth and alongside its regular shows it has revived classic events such as 3SOME and A Day 2 Play, as well as started a regular improvisational theatre group, known as Say What?

Premises and Performance Spaces
The society's traditional home at the Ilam Campus was the Ngaio Marsh Theatre in the University of Canterbury Students' Association building. However, the society also regularly performed in other rooms of the Association building (most notably for its annual festival of student-authored one-act plays called 3SOME), in outdoor theatre settings on campus, the University Theatre in the Christchurch Arts Centre, and in roving street theatre events. However, with the Ngaio Marsh Theatre out of service following the 2011 Christchurch earthquake, performances primarily took place in the Jack Mann Auditorium on the College of Education campus. Since 2019, the society has been primarily performing in the new Ngaio Marsh Theatre in the University's Haere Roa Building.

References

 Strange, Glyn – The Little Theatre – golden years of the New Zealand stage. Clerestory Press, 2000. 
 Harcourt, Peter – A Dramatic Appearance – New Zealand Theatre 1920–1970. Methuen New Zealand, 1978

External links
 University Of Canterbury Drama Society Official site
 University Of Canterbury Musical Theatre Society A sister society that specialises in musical theatre
 University Of Canterbury Students Association The organisational parent and physical home of the performing arts clubs on campus

Drama Society
Canterbury Drama Society
Theatre companies in New Zealand
1921 establishments in New Zealand
Arts organizations established in 1921